The Catholic Bishops' Conference of Vietnam (abbreviated as CBCV; also known as the Episcopal Conference of Vietnam) is the episcopal conference of the Catholic bishops of Vietnam. Initially created in 1960s for South Vietnam, and officially re-founded in 1980 after the reunification of Vietnam, the CBCV is composed of all active and retired members of the Catholic hierarchy (i.e., diocesan, coadjutor, and auxiliary bishops) in Vietnam. The current president of CBCV is Joseph Nguyễn Năng, Archbishop of Ho Chi Minh City.

Organizational structure
The current Catholic Bishops' Conference of Vietnam for term 2022-2025 comprises the following committees:Biên bản Đại hội lần thứ XV của Hội đồng Giám mục Việt Nam

Standing committee
 President: Joseph Nguyễn Năng, Metropolitan Archbishop of Ho Chi Minh City
 Vice President: Joseph Vũ Văn Thiên, Metropolitan Archbishop of Ha Noi
 Secretary General: Josheph Đỗ Mạnh Hùng, Bishop of Phan Thiet
 Deputy General Secretary: Louis Nguyễn Anh Tuấn, Apostolic Administrator of Ha Tinh

Programmatic committees
 Committee on the Bible: Vincent Nguyễn Văn Bản, Bishop of Hai Phong
 Committee on the Catholic Education: Peter Huỳnh Văn Hai, Bishop of Vinh Long
 Committee on Charitable and Social Actions - Caritas Vietnam: Thomas Aquinas Vũ Đình Hiệu, Bishop of Bui Chu
 Committee on Clergy and Seminarians: Joshep Đỗ Quang Khang, Coadjutor bishop of Bac Ninh
 Committee on Consecrated Life: Peter Nguyễn Văn Khảm, Bishop of My Tho
 Committee on Culture: Joseph Đặng Đức Ngân, Bishop of Da Nang
 Committee on the Divine Worship: Emmanuel Nguyễn Hồng Sơn, Bishop of Ba Ria
 Committee on the Doctrine of the Faith: John Đỗ Văn Ngân, Bishop of Xuan Loc
 Committee on Evangelization: Dominic Hoàng Minh Tiến, Bishop of Hung Hoa
 Committee on Family: Dominic Nguyễn Văn Mạnh, Bishop of Da Lat
 Committee on Justice and Peace: Joshep Nguyễn Đức Cường, Bishop of Thanh Hoa
 Committee on the Laity: Joseph Trần Văn Toản, Bishop of Long Xuyen
 Committee on Migration: Joseph Nguyễn Chí Linh, Metropolitan Archbishop of Hue
 Committee on Sacred Arts: Matthew Nguyễn Văn Khôi, Bishop of Quy Nhon
 Committee on Sacred Music: Aloisius Nguyễn Hùng Vị, Bishop of Kon Tum
 Committee on Social Communications: Joseph Nguyễn Tấn Tước, Bishop of Phu Cuong
 Committee on Youth: Peter Nguyễn Văn Viên, Auxiliary Bishop of Vinh

List of presidents
Paul Nguyễn Văn Bình (1966 - 1980)
Joseph-Marie Trịnh Văn Căn (1980 - 1990)
Paul Marie Nguyễn Minh Nhật (1990 - 1995)
Paul Joseph Pham Ðình Tụng (1995 - 2001)
Paul Nguyễn Văn Hòa (2001 - 2007)
Pierre Nguyễn Văn Nhơn (2007 - 2013)
Paul Bùi Văn Đọc (2013 - 2016)
Joseph Nguyễn Chí Linh (2016 - 2022)
Joseph Nguyễn Năng (since 2022)

See also
 Catholic Church in Vietnam
 List of Catholic dioceses in Vietnam

References

External links 
GCatholic entry

V

1980 establishments in Vietnam